The King of the Channel (KOTC) is a yearly dragon boat race in the Netherlands between University College Roosevelt (UCR); the Hogeschool Zeeland (HZ) and Scalda represented by CIOS Goes. Although not a real rowing race, the concept mimics the well known Boat Race.

History 
The specific structure of the event has changed over the years. The 2011 edition of the KOTC involved three events. The first was a dragon boat race between UCR, HZ, and ROC. The second was a businesslike race with 4 person boats. The final race was between HZ and UCR.

Results
 2005: HZ wins in longboat
 2006: RA wins in dragonboat, HZ wins in longboat
 2007: HZ wins in dragonboat
 2008: HZ wins in dragonboat
 2009: 
 2010: HZ wins in dragonboat, RA wins in longboat
 2011: RA wins in longboat and dragonboat
 2018: CIOS Goes Wins overall, student of Sport Coordinator uniformed profession and students outdoor instructor

References

External links 
 King of the Channel rowing website 

Dragon boat racing